Bake is a hamlet in south-east Cornwall, England, United Kingdom.

Bake is the seat of the Moyle family (although Bake itself is in the civil parish of Deviock) and St German's Priory has a mortuary chapel for the Moyle family of Bake.

West of the manor house, a steep tree-lined valley called Bake Wood runs down to the River Seaton. At the top of the valley, seven artificial lakes are commercially operated as Bake Fishing Lakes providing coarse fishing and fly fishing.

There is also a place called Bake in the civil parish of Pelynt.

See also

 Bake Fishing Lakes

References

Hamlets in Cornwall